Emma Hjorth is a district in the municipality of Bærum, Norway. Together with the district Skui, its population (2007) is 6,281.

References

Villages in Akershus
Neighbourhoods in Bærum